Krio may refer to:

Sierra Leone Creole people, also known as Krio people
Krio language, language of the Sierra Leone Krio people
Krio Dayak people, an ethnic group in  West Kalimantan, Indonesia
Krio Dayak language
Keriau River, in West Kalimantan, Indonesia
Cape Krio, place of ancient Cnidos (modern Tekir), Turkey

See also
Krios (disambiguation)
Creole (disambiguation)
Cape Verdean Creole
Criollo (disambiguation)
Keriu
Kriyoro (Suriname)
Kreyol (disambiguation)
Kreol (disambiguation)
Kriol (disambiguation)
Kriolu

Language and nationality disambiguation pages